Puuluup is an Estonian nu-folk duo that was established in 2014.
Members are Ramo Teder (Pastacas as a solo artist) and Marko Veisson.
The instruments are hiiu kannel (talharpa) and loopers.

Discography
 2018 “Süüta mu lumi” (Light my snow)
 2020 “Kasekesed / Kasekäpa”
 2021 "Viimane suusataja"

References

External links

Estonian folk music groups